The 2022 Monte Carlo Rally (also known as the 90e Rallye Automobile Monte-Carlo) was a motor racing event for rally cars that was held over four days between 20 and 23 January 2022. It marked the ninetieth running of the Monte Carlo Rally, and was the first round of the 2022 World Rally Championship, World Rally Championship-2 and World Rally Championship-3. The 2022 event was based in Monaco solely.

Sébastien Ogier and Julien Ingrassia were the defending rally winners. However, Ingrassia did not defend his title as he retired from the sport at the end of 2021 season. Andreas Mikkelsen and Ola Fløene were the defending rally winners in the WRC-2 category, while Yohan Rossel and Benoît Fulcrand were the defending rally winners in the WRC-3 category.

Nine-time world champion Sébastien Loeb and Isabelle Galmiche won the rally. This was Loeb's eightieth rally victory and his first since the 2018 Rally Catalunya. The win also saw Loeb became the oldest driver to win a World Rally Championship event and Galmiche became the first female winner of a WRC fixture since . Their team, M-Sport Ford WRT, won its first rally since the 2018 Wales Rally GB. Mikkelsen successfully defended his title in the WRC-2 category with new co-driver Torstein Eriksen. The Finnish crew of Sami Pajari and Enni Mälkönen won the WRC-3 category.

Background

Entry list
The following crews entered into the rally. The event was opened to crews competing in the World Rally Championship, its support categories, the World Rally Championship-2 and World Rally Championship-3, and privateer entries that were not registered to score points in any championship. Eleven crews were entered under Rally1 regulations, as were twenty-one Rally2 crews in the World Rally Championship-2 and four Rally3 crews in the World Rally Championship-3.

Itinerary
All dates and times are CET (UTC+1).

Report

WRC Rally1

Classification

Special stages

Championship standings

WRC-2 Rally2

Classification

Special stages

Championship standings

WRC-3 Rally3

Classification

Special stages

Championship standings

Notes

References

External links
  
 2022 Monte Carlo Rally at eWRC-results.com
 2022 Monte Carlo Rally at rally-maps.com 

2022 in French motorsport
2022 in Monegasque motorsport
2022 World Rally Championship season
January 2022 sports events in France
2022